Ministry of Maritime Affairs may refer to:

 Ministry of Maritime Affairs (Pakistan)
 Ministry of Maritime Affairs (Portugal)
 Ministry of Maritime Affairs, Islands and Fisheries (Greece)
 Ministry of Maritime Affairs, Transport and Infrastructure, Croatia

See also

 Ministry for Naval Affairs (disambiguation)